Send My Bag is a luggage shipping company for that aims to allow travelers to transport baggage, claiming a lower cost than airline baggage handling fees.

History
Send My Bag was formed after founder Adam Ewart was charged excess baggage fees when helping his girlfriend travel home from university. After paying the fee Ewart returned home and searched the web for a service which offered to deliver luggage at a lower cost. With nothing found, he decided to start Send My Bag. Setting up just one web page for under £100, he created a simple booking system for the business venture.

Prior to 2011 Send My Bag primarily existed as a niche luggage shipper for students. From 2011 onwards, their focus broadened as airlines such as Ryanair took additional steps to dissuade passengers from checking bags, and as airline revenue from baggage fees worldwide dramatically increased.

The service is available as an iOS app.

On 9 September 2012, Ewart appeared on the BBC television program Dragons' Den in search of an investment for his door to door baggage service.

Following the unsuccessful appearance on Dragons' Den, Send My Bag announced a £100k funding from investors Lough Shore Investments.

On 24 November 2014 on CNBC news Ewart announced the launch of US worldwide services. In 2015 Send My Bag further expanded launching a US domestic service and worldwide services from Australia.

Send My Bag provides 24hr worldwide support from offices in Bangor, Northern Ireland and New York City.

Awards 
In celebration of Queen Elizabeth II's 92nd birthday, on 21 April 2018, Send My Bag was announced as winner of the Queen's Awards for Enterprise. At the time of winning the award Send My Bag had shipped 250,000 pieces of luggage in the previous 12 months.

References

Shipping companies of the United Kingdom
Luggage